North Deighton is a village and civil parish in the Harrogate district of North Yorkshire, England. Until 1866, when it became its own parish, the village was part of the parish of Kirk Deighton. The population of the civil parish as taken at the 2011 Census was less than 100. Details are included in the civil parish of Little Ribston, however, North Yorkshire County Council estimated the population in 2014 as having dropped to 80.

The B6164 road runs through the village between Knaresborough and Wetherby with a minor road heading south-west towards Spofforth.

Along with neighbouring Kirk Deighton, the village is mentioned in the Domesday Book and its name derives from a mixture of Old English and Old Norse - Kirkja dīc tūn which means a church, a defensive trench or ditch and a farmstead or village.

To the east of the village is Howe Hill, which is a former Motte-and-bailey castle from around the time of the Norman Conquest. It is also thought to be one of the burial sites of dead soldiers from the Battle of Marston Moor. The area was formerly part of the Royal Forest of Knaresborough (a medieval hunting park) and also part of the Ribston Estate.

References

Sources

External links

Villages in North Yorkshire
Civil parishes in North Yorkshire